Curt Gielow (born. March 18, 1945) is an American Republican politician from Wisconsin.

Born in Evansville, Indiana, Gielow received his degree in pharmacy from St. Louis College of Pharmacy and his masters from Washington University in St. Louis. 

Gielow served in the Wisconsin State Assembly 2003-2007. In 2010, Gielow was elected mayor of Mequon, Wisconsin and had served on the Mequon Common Council. As mayor of Mequon, Gielow began lifting some bans on building and changed some zoning laws to allow more commerce and thus, more business tax base, which in some cases was considered controversial. In the Wisconsin Spring Election April 2013, Gielow was defeated for reelection for Mayor of Mequon by Dan Abendroth.

After service in the Wisconsin Legilsature, Gielow served Concordia University Wisconsin as the Executive Dean of the School of Pharmacy. From July 2013 until the end of 2018 he served as Vice President of Administration and Chief Campus Officer at Concordia University Ann Arbor. 

As of early 2022 Gielow is active in a consultancy role and numbers the Concordia University Wisconsin Foundation as one of his clients.

Notes

Politicians from Evansville, Indiana
People from Mequon, Wisconsin
Washington University in St. Louis alumni
Members of the Wisconsin State Assembly
Mayors of places in Wisconsin
Wisconsin city council members
1945 births
Living people
Concordia University Wisconsin faculty
21st-century American politicians